Milo is a comune (municipality) in the Metropolitan City of Catania in the Italian region Sicily, located about  southeast of Palermo and about  north of Catania.  

Milo borders the following municipalities: Giarre, Sant'Alfio, Zafferana Etnea.

References

External links
 Official website

Cities and towns in Sicily